The list of ship launches in 1868 includes a chronological list of some ships launched in 1868.


References 

1868
Ship launches